Aloisio da Milano, also known as Aloisio da Carezano, Aleviz Milanets and Aleviz Fryazin (Алевиз Миланец, Алевиз Фрязин, Алевиз Фрязин Миланец in Russian) was an Italian architect who worked in Muscovy.

Architectural Work in Moscow
Aloisio da Carezano came to Moscow in 1494, at the invitation of Ivan III, to replace Pietro Antonio Solari as a senior court architect, responsible for fortifications and palaces.

 In 1495, he rebuilt the walls and towers of the Moscow Kremlin, along the Neglinnaya River.
 In 1499–1508, Aloisio da Milano constructed a few stone chambers, which today constitute the first three floors of the Terem Palace.
 In 1508–1516, he also dug a moat (later dubbed the Alevizov moat in his honor) along the Kremlin wall on the side of the Red Square, covered with limestone and bricks. It was filled up in the 19th century.
 Aloisio da Milano also constructed a dam on the Neglinnaya River in 1508, and a bridge over it in 1516.

Origin of title
The Fryazin title originates from the old Russian word фрязь (fryaz), derived from frank, that was used to denote people from Northern Italy.

See also
Aloisio the New

15th-century Italian architects
16th-century Italian architects
Architects from Milan
Russian architects
Year of birth missing
Year of death missing